TrapXFicante is the fifth studio album by Puerto Rican singer Farruko, released on September 15, 2017, through Sony Music Latin. It was produced by Ez el Ezeta, Prida Beats, Christian Adorno, Rvssian, Sharo Towers, Andy Clay, Luis Salazar, Jhon Paul Villasana, Ezequiel Garcia, Jan Paul Pérez, José Carlos Cruz, Fredy Neo, Noah Assad, Rafael Jiménez, George Ladkani, Elijah Sarraga, J Melodiez, Juan Francisco Méndez, Luismer José Pena, Wadiz Ricardo Pena, Tainy and Nítido en el Nintendo, and features collaborations with Bad Bunny, Rvssian, Arcángel, Jacob Forever, Ñengo Flow, Darell, Fetty Wap, Anuel AA and Químico Ultramega.

The album peaked at numbers 3 and 184 at the Top Latin Albums and Billboard 200 charts, respectively. It was certified platinum in United States, being his second album to do so.

Background
The album was first announced in August 2017, following the commercial success of the single "Krippy Kush", the name is a word play meaning "trap dealer", using the words of "trap" and "traficante", the latter meaning dealer in Spanish, it references the genre which the album focuses. The project explores the trap genre after Farruko felt that the genre was under-represented within the Latin music industry as well as the limitations he encountered as a reggaeton artist, he likened the switch to trap as an awakening, saying that "I feel reborn, it's an evolution, reggaeton as a genre limited me as an artist, I felt trapped in a personality".

Throughout the album, Farruko experiments with a variety of genres mainly merging them with trap such as in the Cha-cha-chá-infused "Chá Chá Chá" featuring Cuban singer Jacob Forever, the R&B "Para Acá" and the EDM-inspired "Amanecio" and "Suéltame Tú". To promote the album, Farruko embarked on the TrapXFicante Tour, which started in the United States and later continued through Latin America.

Singles
The first single for the album was "Liberace" featuring Puerto Rican rapper Anuel AA, released on June 30, 2016. The second single was "Don't Let Go", released on March 16, 2017. The third single was "Krippy Kush" featuring Puerto Rican rapper Bad Bunny and record producer Rvssian, released on August 3, 2017. The song peaked at numbers seventy-five and five at the Billboard Hot 100 and Hot Latin Songs charts, respectively, it also charted within the top 20 in El Salvador, Puerto Rico and Spain. "Liberace" was certified gold in United States in 2018 while "Krippy Kush" was certified multi-platinum in the country also in 2018 after selling 960,000 copies.

Track listing

Charts

Certifications

References

2017 albums
Farruko albums